Mashhad-e Bazarjan (also Romanized as Mashhad-e Bāzarjān and Mashhad-e Bāzerjān; also known as Mashad, Mashhad, and Mashhadī Bazarjan) is a village in Bazarjan Rural District, in the Central District of Tafresh County, Markazi Province, Iran. At the 2006 census, its population was 50, in 25 families.

References 

Populated places in Tafresh County